Titus Ozon (13 May 1927 – 24 November 1996) was a Romanian international football striker and manager. He was considered one of the greatest talents of the postwar in the Romanian football, famous for his extraordinary ability to dribble.

Career
He was born in Bucharest, in the Obor neighborhood. He started football at Unirea Tricolor București at the age of 10, under the guidance of coach Ștefan Cârjan. In 1948 he came to Dinamo, from which he was loaned disciplinary to Dinamo Braşov in 1951. After returning he was the top-goalsocorer of the Divizia A for two years in a row, in 1952 with 17 goals and in 1953 with 12 goals. His other performances include securing the second place three times and the four finals of the Cupa României he played in 1954 (for Dinamo), 1958 (Progresul), 1961 and 1962 (Rapid).

In 1952, Titus Ozon was part of the Divizia A team that played two matches in the Soviet Union, with CSKA and Dynamo Moscow. Following the tournament, the members of this team received poor quality Pobeda watches, which they threw away, this being the first incident that aroused dissatisfaction with the communist regime.

In 1953, during a match with Dinamo Tbilisi played in Bucharest, Titus Ozon manages to pass the ball between the legs of Georgian star Avtandil Gogoberidze. After this game he was named "enemy of the people" by the communist regime, which accused him of making fun of the Soviet people, being sanctioned with ten percent of his salary and arrested at the garrison for one day.

In 1955 he wants to leave Dinamo, because of the "soldierly atmosphere there", and secretly signs with Progresul București, but he was caught by the Securitate, who wanted to prevent him from submitting a report by accusing him that he had legionnaire sympathies, because he played at Unirea Tricolor. According to an interview given by Ozon in 1995, he was deported to the Delta to cut reeds, where he was seized in a cabin, guarded by a security guard. He manages to escape the arrest and arrives at the federation headquarters, hidden in a car, in time to submit his memory. The coach from Progresul, Cornel Drăgușin, considered him a "conflicting, independent and brilliant player on the field".

In 1958, after returning to the country from a Progresul tournament in Albania, he was caught in the customs with about 3,000 ivory buttons for which he was charged with smuggling and suspended from sports. After six months, according to the writer George Mihalache, Titus Ozon met with Gheorghe Gheorghiu-Dej on Calea Victoriei and asked for his suspension to be lifted, Gheorghiu-Dej agreed with the condition that Ozon would play for the team that he liked, Rapid.

In 1955 he plays in the comedy film Și Ilie face sport (Ilie also does sport), directed by Andrei Călărașu, in which the lives and morals of the athletes and fans were related. Ozon also played theater, being the star of the satire show "Bujor 12", which was played at the "Constantin Tănase" theater from Bucharest in 1957.

He retired from football activity in 1964 and became the head coach of several teams in Romania, managing to train once outside the country at the national side of Libya, due to the good relations between presidents Nicolae Ceaușescu and Muammar Gaddafi.

A park in Sector 2 of Bucharest bears his name.

International career
Titus Ozon played 22 games and scored 7 goals for Romania. He scored in his debut when coach Emerich Vogl sent him on the field in order to replace Gheorghe Bodo in the 73rd minute of a friendly against Czechoslovakia which ended with a 3–1 victory. He also played matches at the 1964 European Nations' Cup qualifiers and at the 1954 and 1958 World Cup qualifiers. He was also part of Romania's 1952 Summer Olympics squad in which he played in the 2–1 loss against Hungary.

International goals
Scores and results list Romania's goal tally first, score column indicates score after each Ozon goal.

Honours

Player
Unirea Tricolor București
Divizia B: 1946–47
Dinamo București
Cupa României runner-up: 1954
Progresul București
Cupa României runner-up: 1957–58
Rapid București
Cupa României runner-up: 1960–61, 1961–62

Individual
Divizia A top scorer: 1952, 1953

Manager
Argeş Pitești
Divizia A: 1971–72

Notes

References

External links

Titus Ozon player profile at Labtof.ro
Titus Ozon manager profile at Labtof.ro

1927 births
1996 deaths
Footballers from Bucharest
Romanian footballers
Romania international footballers
Olympic footballers of Romania
Footballers at the 1952 Summer Olympics
Romanian football managers
Liga I players
Liga II players
Unirea Tricolor București players
FC Progresul București players
FC Dinamo București players
FC Rapid București players
FC Argeș Pitești managers
AFC Dacia Unirea Brăila managers
CS Pandurii Târgu Jiu managers
CSM Jiul Petroșani managers
FC Progresul București managers
Romanian expatriate football managers
Libya national football team managers
Association football forwards